Briggera is a genus of diatom known from the fossil record.

Species
B. ornithocephala.

References

Fossil algae
Prehistoric SAR supergroup genera

†

Early Cretaceous genus first appearances
Miocene genus extinctions